The 2018 Moroccan Throne Cup will be the 62nd staging of the Moroccan Throne Cup, the knockout football tournament in Morocco. The winners will be assured a place for the 2018–19 CAF Confederation Cup.

The 2018 Moroccan Throne Cup Final played at the Prince Moulay Abdellah Stadium in Rabat, on 18 November 2018. Nahdat Berkane winning their 1st title.

Fourth round
The fourth round was played on 12–16 May 2018.

Final phase

Qualified teams
The following teams competed in the 2018 Coupe du Trône.

16 teams of 2017–18 Botola

AS FAR
Chabab Atlas Khénifra
Chabab Rif Hoceima
Difaâ El Jadidi
FUS Rabat
Hassania Agadir
IR Tanger
Kawkab Marrakech
Moghreb Tétouan
Olympic Safi
Olympique Khouribga
Racing de Casablanca
Raja Casablanca
Rapide Oued Zem
RSB Berkane
Wydad Casablanca

9 teams of 2017–18 Botola 2

AS Salé
Club Rachad Bernoussi
Ittihad Khemisset
KAC Kénitra
Olympique Dcheira
Raja Beni Mellal
Union Sidi Kacem
Wydad de Fès
Wydad Témara

2 teams of 2017–18 Division Nationale

Stade Marocain
Renaissance Ezzmamra

4 teams of 2017–18 Championnat du Maroc Amateurs I

Mouloudia Missour
Najah Souss
Nasma Sportif Settat
Union de Touarga

1 team of 2017–18 Championnat du Maroc Amateurs II
US Amal Tiznit

Bracket

Round of 32
 1/16th finals of the Coupe du Trône : 1–2 September 2018

Draw of the Coupe du Trône 2017 - 2018 season

Round of 16
Qualified teams
The following teams competed in the 2018 Coupe du Trône, Round of 16:
10 teams of 2017–18 Botola

Difaâ El Jadidi
FUS Rabat
Hassania Agadir
IR Tanger
Wydad Casablanca
Olympic Safi
Olympique Khouribga
Raja Casablanca
Rapide Oued Zem
RSB Berkane

5 teams of 2017–18 Botola 2

Ittihad Khemisset
KAC Kénitra
Olympique Dcheira
Wydad de Fès
Wydad Témara

1 teams of 2017–18 Division Nationale

Stade Marocain

Matches
 1/8th finals of the Coupe du Trône : 11–13; 26 September and 3 October 2018

Quarter-finals

 1/4th finals of the Coupe du Trône : 6–7 October 2018

Semi-finals

 1/2th finals of the Coupe du Trône: 2–3 November 2018

Final

References

External links
Moroccan Cup 2017 - 2018, Goalzz.com

Morocco
Coupe
Coupe